Earl Grey is a village in the Canadian province of Saskatchewan within the Rural Municipality of Longlaketon No. 219 and Census Division No. 6. The village is located approximately 67 kilometres north of the City of Regina.

The area was first settled in 1901 by Paul Henderson, younger brother of Jack Henderson, hangman of Louis Riel.  Subsequent to Paul Henderson's death from exposure in 1903, other settlers followed; in 1906 the village was incorporated and named "Earl Grey" after Albert Grey, 4th Earl Grey, Canada's Governor General at the time.

Currently, the town has two churches (Christ Lutheran Church [ELCIC] and a United Church), one Kingdom Hall of Jehovah's Witnesses, several old-age homes, a hotel, a curling rink, and a veterinary clinic. A small statue of a grain elevator is displayed in the downtown area, a commemorative tribute to the village's once-thriving grain economy.

The public school was downsized to a Kindergarten-Grade 8 school in the 2003–2004 school year, before closing completely in 2007.

History 
Earl Grey incorporated as a village on July 27, 1906.

Demographics 

See also 

 List of communities in Saskatchewan
 Villages of Saskatchewan

References

External links

Villages in Saskatchewan
Longlaketon No. 219, Saskatchewan
Division No. 6, Saskatchewan